Ayesha Khan is a Pakistani actress. She is known for her drama roles in Mehndi, Naqab Zan, Bharosa Pyar Tera and Bisaat e Dil.

Early life
Ayesha was born in Karachi, Pakistan. She completed her studies from University of Karachi.

Career
She appeared in PTV Channel dramas. She was known for her PTV dramas, Afshan, Aroosa, Family 93 and Mehandi. She along with her younger sister were popular during the golden era of television in Pakistan.

Personal life
Ayesha's younger sister Khalida Riyasat died in 1996. After the death of her sister, she took a small break from the industry but she returned.

Filmography

Television series

Telefilm

Film

References

External links
 

1948 births
20th-century Pakistani actresses
Actresses from Karachi
Living people
Pakistani television actresses
21st-century Pakistani actresses
Pakistani film actresses